The Armenian General Benevolent Union (AGBU, Eastern Armenian: Հայկական Բարեգործական Ընդհանուր Միություն, ՀԲԸՄ, Haykakan Baregortsakan Endhanur Miutyun, or ,Hay Parekordzagan Enthanour Miyutyun or Hopenetmen for short, UGAB) is a non-profit Armenian organization established in Cairo, Egypt, in 1906. With the onset of World War II, headquarters were moved to New York City, New York.

With an annual international budget of over $47 million, AGBU preserves and promotes the Armenian identity and heritage through educational, cultural and humanitarian programs, annually serving some 500,000 Armenians in over 30 countries. In 2006, the AGBU celebrated its centenary in its headquarters in New York City.
The Armenian General Benevolent Union (AGBU) was founded on April 15, 1906, in Cairo, Egypt, by the initiative of renowned national figure Boghos Nubar, son of Nubar Pasha (three times prime minister of Egypt) and other prominent representatives of the Egyptian-Armenian community to contribute to the spiritual and cultural development of the Armenian people.

The goal was to establish a union that would in every way assist the Armenian people, the future of which, as a minority in the Ottoman Empire, was endangered.

History
Between 1906 and 1912, the AGBU provided the villagers of the Western Armenia with seeds, agricultural instruments, etc. It established schools and orphanages in Western Armenia, Cilicia and other Armenian-populated regions of the Ottoman Empire. In 1914, AGBU had 142 branches in Western Armenia, Cilicia, USA, Argentina, Europe and Africa with 8,533 members.
 

The First World War and the Armenian genocide were turning points for both the Armenian nation and the AGBU. In 1914, Boghos Nubar left Egypt and moved to Paris. Despite the huge losses in different chapters of the union, the AGBU managed to render tangible help to the Genocide survivors. In October 1915, the Sisvan school with 1,222 students, later an orphanage and a camp for women refugees, was established by the AGBU in the desert near Port Said, Egypt. This camp is where survivors of Musa Dagh settled. In the years following the Genocide, the AGBU became mainly involved in taking care of orphans. After the war, the AGBU was reformed and founded new branches in Armenian-populated regions of the Near East, Greece, France and USA.

In 1921, the union's headquarters was moved from Cairo to Paris. After World War I, the main goal of the AGBU was to preserve and promote Armenian language, identity and heritage through educational, cultural and humanitarian programs. In 1926, AGBU established the Melkonian Educational Institution in Nicosia, Cyprus, Nubarian foundation, which provided scholarships to Armenian youngsters to study in European universities, and the Marie Nubar Dormitory in Paris in 1930.

After the death of Boghos Nubar in 1930, oil magnate and prominent Armenian figure Galust Gyulbenkian took over the presidency of AGBU. After heading the union for two years, the son of the former, Zareh Bey Nubar, replaced him and headed the union until 1940.

During World War II, the AGBU headquarters was moved from Paris to New York as a result of Nazi occupation. In 1942, Arshak Karagyozian became the fourth president of the AGBU.

The AGBU's activities aimed at national preservation became more effective during the post-war period, especially in Alex Manoogian’s tenure between 1953–1989. The AGBU expanded and became the biggest and most influential Diaspora-Armenian organization in the world. In 1954 Alex Manoogian founded the ՚՚"Alex and Marie Manoogian" cultural fund; in 1968 he established the "Alex Manoogian" cultural fund. Through these funds, a number of educational and other establishments were built over the next several years.

Today, the AGBU has chapters in 72 cities in 30 countries around the world, with 22,000 members, 120 branches, 27 cultural centers spread worldwide in the US, Europe, Near East, South America and Australia. The AGBU has 24 schools (6,600 students) and funds more than 16 educational establishments. The AGBU has two libraries, one in Paris and the other in New York City.

In 1989, Louise Manoogian Simone, the daughter of Alex Manoogian, became the president of the AGBU. It gave a new breath to the strengthening of ties between the Armenians of Armenia and diaspora. In 1988, immediately following the Spitak earthquake, the AGBU organized the transportation of food, clothes, and medicine to the disaster zone. In 1990, the AGBU opened a representative office in Yerevan. Restarting its activities in Armenia after a 50-year interval, along with humanitarian assistance, the AGBU carries out projects aimed at and contributing to the development of the country.

In 1995, the AGBU founded the first Young Professionals (YP) Group in Los Angeles; today, there are 37 YP Groups and Partners worldwide.

Since 2002 Berge Setrakian, partner at renowned law firm DLA Piper, is the president of AGBU.

In 2017, the AGBU opened the AGBU Vatche and Tamar Manoukian Performing Arts Center in Pasadena, California in the United States.

Centers, chapters and offices

Argentina: Buenos Aires, Córdoba
Armenia: Yerevan
Australia: Melbourne, Sydney
Austria: Vienna
Brazil: São Paulo
Bulgaria: Burgas, Dobrich, Haskovo, Plovdiv, Rousse, Silistra, Sliven, Sofia, Varna and Yambol
Canada: Montreal, Toronto, Vancouver
Cyprus: Nicosia, Larnaca
Egypt: Alexandria, Cairo
Ethiopia: Addis Ababa
France: Lyon, Marseilles, Nice, Paris, Saint-Étienne-Saint-Chamond, Valence, Vienne
Greece: Athens, Thessaloniki
Iraq: Baghdad
Iran: Tehran
Lebanon: Beirut, Sin El Fil, Alay, Zahle, Tripoli, Sidon
Italy: Milan
South Africa: Johannesburg
Switzerland: Geneva
Syria: Aleppo, Damascus, Qamishli, Kessab, Latakia
United Kingdom: London
United States: Boston, Canoga Park, Chicago, Cleveland, Detroit, Fresno, California, Glendale, California-San Gabriel, California, Houston, Manhattan Beach, California, Los Angeles, New England District, Oakland-San Francisco, Orange County, Pasadena, California, Philadelphia, President's Club, Providence, San Diego, San Fernando Valley, Silicon Valley, Washington, D.C., Watertown, Massachusetts
Uruguay: Montevideo.
Netherlands: Almelo.

Education
AGBU operates 24 day and Saturday schools. Some of the schools run by the AGBU include:
AGBU Manoogian-Demirdjian School, Canoga Park, Los Angeles,  California
AGBU Vatche and Tamar Manoukian High School, Pasadena, California
AGBU Alexander Primary School, Sydney, Australia
Manoogian School, Southfield, Michigan
Alex Manoogian School, Montreal, Quebec.
Marie Manoogian School, Buenos Aires, Argentina
AGBU Armenian Central High School, Aleppo, Syria (since 1954),
Nubarian (primary school) and Alex Manooguian (secondary school), Montevideo, Uruguay.

It awards scholarship grants and loans to more than 500 students worldwide; it supports the American University of Armenia and Yerevan State University.

The Union has funded a number of benevolent causes, including supporting the Lord Byron School, which was donated by the British government following the earthquake in Armenia in 1988. The school has continued to twin with the Holgate School in Nottingham.

Youth and culture
Through its extensive global network of 69 chapters, young professionals groups, centers and offices, the organization sponsors numerous worthwhile cultural and humanitarian programs, including children's centers, soup kitchens, summer camps, athletics and Scouts, internship and mentoring programs and the performing arts. It claims to be the world's largest non-profit Armenian organization.

Sayat Nova International Composition Competition
One of AGBU's cultural efforts is the Sayat Nova International Composition Competition.  Started in 2006, Sayat Nova International Composition Competition introduces the greater music community to Armenian cultural and inspires talented young composers.
The competition seeks works written for a mixed ensemble of Armenian and Western instruments and set to the text of an Armenian poet.  In 2006, the poetry of Sayat Nova was featured, in 2014 it was Daniel Varoujan, and 2016 will feature Grigor Narekatsi.
The competition offers an amazing array of financial awards and opportunities to composers including a premiere performance in Carnegie Hall

Publications
With more than a dozen publications in six languages, AGBU has a rich publishing tradition

 Ararat Quarterly (first published in 1959) A quarterly of literature, history, popular culture and the arts.
AGBU News (New York, NY, USA)
AGBU Voice (Bulgaria)
Arek Monthly (Cairo, Egypt)
Desilk (Scarborough, Canada)
Deghegadou (Cairo, Egypt)
Generation 3 (Argentina)
Hayatsk (Aleppo, Syria)
Hoosharar (New York, NY, USA)
Khosnag (Beirut, Lebanon)
Mioutune (Sydney, Australia)
Parekordzagani Tsayn (Sofia, Bulgaria)
Revue Arménienne des Questions Contemporaines (France)
UGAB-France (Paris, France)
Yeram (Damascus, Syria)
Generacion 3 (Buenos Aires, Argentina)
AGBU Scout "Սկաուտ" (Yerevan, Armenia)

Presidents
Boghos Nubar (1906–1928) – Founder
Calouste Gulbenkian (1930–1932)
Zareh Nubar (1932–1943)
Arshag Karagheusian (1943–1953) of A & M Karagheusian
Alex Manoogian (1953–1989) – Honorary Life President.
Louise Manoogian Simone (1989–2002)
Berge Setrakian (2002–present)

References

External links
AGBU Official Website
AGBU Blog
AGBU YouTube channel
 

AGBU Regional:
Armenia
AGBU Armenia
Canada
AGBU Montreal
Europe
UGAB – AGBU Europe (France)
UGAB Europe in French
AGBU UK
Middle East
AGBU-Egypt Official Site
AGBU Lebanon
South America
AGBU Argentina
AGBU Sao Paulo, Brazil
AGBU Uruguay
USA
AGBU Chicago
AGBU Generation Next, Southern California

AGBU schools:
AGBU Alex and Marie Manoogian School, Southfield, Michigan
Ecole Alex Manoogian, Montreal, Quebec, Canada
Manoogian-Demirdjian School, Canoga Park, CA
AGBU Zarookian School, Scarborough, Toronto, Ontario, Canada

 
Armenian culture
Armenian-American history
Armenian-American culture in New York City
Non-profit organizations based in New York City
Organizations established in 1906
1906 establishments in Egypt